Boten is a town in Laos in Luang Namtha Province. Boten is on the China–Laos border. It is opposite the Chinese town Mohan. While Boten is part of Laos, most of its inhabitants speak Mandarin Chinese as their native language. The main currency used in Boten is the Chinese yuan.

After 5 years of construction, in December 2021 both the Vientiane–Boten Railway and Yuxi–Mohan railways opened, connecting the town south towards Vientiane and towards Kunming, China to the north.  Boten is the northernmost Lao town on the 414 km railway, with 198 km of tunnels and 62 km of bridges, that runs at an operating speed of 160 km per hour.  The town is served by Boten railway station.

Special Economic Zone 

In 2002, a big casino was built in Boten. The casino mainly attracted Chinese visitors as gambling is illegal in China. In 2011 the Chinese government requested Laos to close this casino. Today the casino is abandoned.

References

The Rebirth of Casino Town Boten, Laos | Borderlands | Full Episode

Citations

Luang Namtha province
China-Laos border crossings